Governor Green or Greene may refer to:

Sir Charles Green, 1st Baronet (1749–1831), Civil Governor of Grenada
Dwight H. Green (1897–1958), 30th Governor of Illinois
Fred W. Green (1871–1936), 31st Governor of Michigan
Josh Green (politician) (born 1970), 9th Governor of Hawaii
Nehemiah Green (1837–1890), 4th Governor of Kansas
Robert Stockton Green (1831–1890), 27th Governor of New Jersey
Theodore F. Green (1867–1966), 57th Governor of Rhode Island
Thomas Greene (governor) (1609–1651), 2nd Proprietary Governor of Maryland
Warren Green (1869–1945), 13th Governor of South Dakota
William Greene (governor) (1731–1809), 2nd Governor of Rhode Island
William Greene (colonial governor) (1695–1758), 23rd, 25th, 27th, and 29th Governor of the Colony of Rhode Island and Providence Plantations

See also
Governor Greene Cemetery, Rhode Island